Alnus serrulata, the hazel alder or smooth alder, is a thicket-forming shrub in the family Betulaceae. It is native to eastern North America and can be found from western Nova Scotia and southern New Brunswick south to Florida and Texas.

Description
The scientific name originates from alnus which is an old name for alder; serrulata points to the finely-toothed leaf margins which it possesses. It takes about 10 yrs to mature. The plant prefers moist soil near streams, pond margins, and riversides. It usually has multiple stems from its base and reddish-green flowers. The broad, flat, dark green leaves are about 2 to 4 inches long.

Leaf: The simple, round leaves are obovate, 2 to 5 in long, 1.2 to 2.8 in wide, obtuse, wider at middle, and V-shaped base. Veins are pinnate and conspicuous. Leaves have a smooth texture above and hairy texture below. The upper side of the leaves are dark green and the undersides are pale green.

Flower: The flowers are monoecious, meaning that both sexes are found on a single plant. Male (Staminate) catkins are 1.6-2.4 in long; female (Pistillate) catkins are 1/2 in long. Reddish-green flowers open in March to April.

Fruit: The ovate, dark brown, cone-like fruit is hard with winged scales. Seeds are produced in small cones and do not have wings. Fruit usually matures during fall and is quite persistent.

Twig: The twigs are reddish-brown and have a 3-angled-pith; young twigs are covered with hairs.

Bark: The bark is brownish gray, smooth, and has a bitter and astringent taste.

Distribution

Alnus serrulata is mainly located in eastern North America. It ranges from Maine to Northern Florida, west to southeastern Oklahoma, Missouri, and Illinois. It also grows along the Mississippi river. It is not present in northern New Hampshire and Vermont. Smooth Alder is classified as an facultative wetland species in the Atlantic and Gulf Coastal Plains and an obligate wetland species in the North and Midwest.

Taxonomy
The scientific name of Smooth Alder is Alnus serrulata (Aiton) Willd., synonymous with Alnus noveboracensis Britton, Alnus rubra Desfontaines ex Spach, Alnus rugosa (Du Roi) Sprengel, Alnus rugosa (Du Roi) Sprengel var. serrulata (W. Aiton) H. Winkler, Alnus serrulata (W. Aiton) Willdenow var. subelliptica Fernald, and Betula serrulata W. Aiton. 
It has English common names including common alder, tag alder, hazel alder, and smooth alder.

Cultivation
Alnus serrulata can be found in a habitats such as streambanks, riversides, and swamps. Water use is high and it requires sun or part-sun. It also requires moist soil that has a pH of 6.8-7.2. Alnus serrulata needs 5–10-foot spacing in wildlife habitat.

Uses

Because the plant resides in riversides or stream streambanks, it usually functions as a stabilizer and restorer for those habitats. It is also used to treat astringent, diuretic, emetic, ophthalmic, and purgative symptoms. A tea made from the bark is said to work as a treatment for diarrhea, coughs, toothaches, sore mouth, and the pain of birth.

References

1.	Seiler, John R., Jensen, Edward C., and Peterson, John A.. "Alnus Serrulata Fact Sheet." VT Forest Biology and Dendrology. Virginia Tech. Department of Forest Resources and Environmental Conservation, 2010. Web. 9 May 2011. <http://dendro.cnre.vt.edu/dendrology/syllabus/factsheet.cfm?ID=8>.

2.	Mohlenbrock, Robert H. "Plant Fact Sheet." USDA. USDA NRCS PLANTS, 30 Jan. 2002. Web. 25 Jan. 2011. <http://plants.usda.gov/factsheet/pdf/fs_alse2.pdf>.

3.	Tenaglia, Dan. "Alnus Serrulata Page." Missouri Flora Web Page. Missouriplants, 8 Feb. 2007. Web. 10 May 2011. <http://www.missouriplants.com/Catkins/Alnus_serrulata_page.html >.

4.	Seton, Ernest Thompson. "Betulaceae." The Forester's Manual; Or, The Forest Trees of Eastern North America ... 10th ed. Vol. 9. Garden City, NY: Doubleday, Page &, 1912. 57. Print.

5.	Fergus, Charles, and Amelia Hansen. Trees of New England: a Natural History. Guilford, CT: FalconGuide, 2005. 4. Print.

6.	Seton, Ernest Thompson. The Book of Woodcraft. Garden City, NY: Garden City Pub., 1921. 383. Print.

7. Tatnall, Robert Richardson. Flora of Delaware and the Eastern Shore; an Annotated List of the Ferns and Flowering Plants of the Peninsula of Delaware, Maryland and Virginia. [Wilmington]: Society of Natural History of Delaware, 1946. 99. Print.

serratula
Trees of Eastern Canada
Trees of the Eastern United States
Flora of the Northeastern United States
Flora of the Southeastern United States
Flora of the North-Central United States
Flora of Texas
Flora of the Appalachian Mountains
Plants described in 1789